Gertjan Martens (born 20 September 1988) is a Belgian footballer who plays for Knokke in the Belgian National Division 1 as a centre back.

Club career

Eendracht Aalst
On 1 February 2020 it was confirmed, that Martens had joined S.C. Eendracht Aalst in the Belgian Second Amateur Division.

References

External links
 

1988 births
Living people
Belgian footballers
K.S.K. Ronse players
K.V. Oostende players
S.K. Beveren players
Royal Antwerp F.C. players
Royale Union Saint-Gilloise players
A.F.C. Tubize players
R.W.D. Molenbeek players
S.C. Eendracht Aalst players
Belgian Pro League players
Challenger Pro League players
Belgian Third Division players
Association football central defenders